Pereute telthusa is a butterfly of the family Pieridae. It is found in South America, including Peru, Ecuador, Bolivia and the lower Amazon in Brazil.

Pierini
Fauna of Brazil
Pieridae of South America
Taxa named by William Chapman Hewitson
Butterflies described in 1860